The year 1631 in science and technology involved some significant events.

Astronomy
 Using Kepler's predictions of planetary transits made in 1630, Pierre Gassendi made the first recorded observation of the Transit of Mercury on November 7th. The observed size of Mercury's disc was significantly smaller than had been expected from Ptolemaic theory.

Geology
 December 16 – Volcanic eruption of Mount Vesuvius for the only time this century.

Mathematics
 William Oughtred publishes Clavis Mathematicae, introducing the multiplication sign (×) and proportion sign.
 Some of Thomas Harriot's writings on algebra are published posthumously as Artis Analyticae Praxis.

Technology
 Earliest known bentside spinet, made by Hieronymus de Zentis.

Births
 Richard Lower, English physician who performed the first direct blood transfusion (died 1691)
 approx. date – William Ball, English astronomer (died 1690)

Deaths
 October 20 – Michael Maestlin, German astronomer and mathematician (born 1550)
 26 October – Catherine de Parthenay, French noblewoman and mathematician (b. 1554)
 December 10 – Sir Hugh Myddelton, Welsh-born goldsmith and hydraulic engineer (born c. 1560)

References

 
17th century in science
1630s in science